Miss Coca Cola is a 1955 Indian Hindi-language romantic thriller film directed by Kedar Kapoor. The film was an early example of a brand (Coca Cola) being used in a film title. Some of the films that made use of the trade name were Shri 420, Chalti Ka Naam Gaadi, An Evening In Paris and others such as Taal and Yaadein. The film was produced by Danny Films and had music composed by O. P. Nayyar, with lyrics by Majrooh Sultanpuri. The film was one of the earlier Shammi Kapoor hits for lyricist Sultanpuri, who had earlier given popular lyrics in Andaz (1949).

The cast included Shammi Kapoor, Geeta Bali, Kuldip Kaur, Johnny Walker, Lalita Pawar, Om Prakash, Helen and Kamal Kapoor. The film was a commercial success at the box office. Johnny Walker and Helen provided the comic interest as native Spanish lovers.

The film revolved around a poor girl, Ganga, who becomes a night club dancer called "Miss Coca Cola" when her father is implicated in a murder case. Helped by Kamal, a rich young man, she is able to prove her father's innocence.

Plot
Ganga (Geeta Bali) comes from a poor family and lives with her father, sister Madhu, and brother Pappu. When her father is unable to pay the Rs. 1000 dowry money to the bridegroom at Ganga's wedding, the marriage is called off by the groom's family. Desperate, Ganga's father resorts to stealing the money from a man who is subsequently killed. The blame for the murder falls on Ganga's father who is arrested. The three siblings try to eke out a living by doing odd jobs. Pappu meets with an accident when he gets hit by Kamal's (Shammi Kapoor) car. Kamal helps the family and Ganga starts working as a night club dancer and goes by the name, Miss Coca Cola. Kamal and Ganga fall in love and together they try to find the real killer. Eventually they succeed and Ganga's father is freed.

Cast
 Shammi Kapoor as Kamal
 Geeta Bali as Ganga
 Helen
 Johnny Walker
 Om Prakash
 Kamal Kapoor
 Kuldip Kaur
 Lalita Pawar
 Mumtaz Begum

Soundtrack
The music was composed by O. P. Nayyar, with lyrics by Majrooh Sultanpuri who set a benchmark by finishing all 8 soundtrack lyrics in a mere 24 hours. The playback singers were Geeta Dutt, Mohammed Rafi, Shamshad Begum, Mukesh and Asha Bhosle.

Song list

References

External links
 

1955 films
1950s Hindi-language films
Films scored by O. P. Nayyar
Indian romantic thriller films
1950s romantic thriller films